Victoria Park is a multi-use stadium in Kingstown, Saint Vincent and the Grenadines . It is used as the stadium of Avenues United FC matches.  The capacity of the stadium is 3,500 spectators.  It hosted the Group B matches of the 2010 Caribbean Championship.

References

Football venues in Saint Vincent and the Grenadines
Multi-purpose stadiums in Saint Vincent and the Grenadines
Buildings and structures in Kingstown